Temim Fruchter is a writer and formerly the drummer in The Shondes, an indie punk band from Brooklyn, NY. Fruchter is outspoken about being an Orthodox-raised Jew who opposes the occupation of Palestine. In 2007, Heeb Magazine listed Fruchter as one of the Heeb 100.

Fruchter's writing has also been published in a number of venues including Brevity. She is a regular contributor to Tom Tom Magazine: A magazine about female drummers  and is a former blogger for AfterEllen.

Notes and references

Former Orthodox Jews
Living people
Jewish American musicians
Jewish anti-Zionism in the United States
Jews in punk rock
Year of birth missing (living people)
21st-century American Jews
Women in punk